Kristoffer Paulsen may refer to:

 Kristoffer Paulsen Vatshaug (born 1981), Norwegian former footballer
 Kristoffer Forgaard Paulsen (born 2004), Norwegian footballer who plays for Viking FK